Novonikolayevsky District is an administrative district (raion), one of the thirty-three in Volgograd Oblast, Russia. As a municipal division, it is incorporated as Novonikolayevsky Municipal District. It is located in the northwest of the oblast. Its administrative center is the urban locality (a work settlement) of Novonikolayevsky. Population:  25,511 (2002 Census);  The population of the administrative center accounts for 43.9% of the district's total population.

References

Notes

Sources

Districts of Volgograd Oblast